The 1965 Giro d'Italia was the 48th edition of the Giro d'Italia, one of cycling's Grand Tours. The field consisted of 100 riders, and 81 riders finished the race.

By rider

By nationality

References

1965 Giro d'Italia
1965